The 1896–97 Welsh Amateur Cup was the seventh season of the Welsh Amateur Cup. The cup was won by Coppenhall who defeated Rhos Eagle Wanderers 3–2 in the final, at Buckley.  An ancient parish within the growing railway town of Crewe, Coppenhall became the first English club to win the trophy.  In the same season, Coppenhall won the Crewe & District Cup, the Crewe League and the Sentinel Trophy - their successful side including George Betts (later of Nantwich and Crewe Alexandra), Ike Baker (1926 FA Cup Final referee) and Joe Foster (later of Stockport County).

First round

Second round

Third round

Fourth round

Semi-final

Final

References

1896-97
Welsh Cup
1896–97 domestic association football cups